Barong may refer to any of the following things:
 Barong Tagalog, an embroidered formal garment of the Philippines
 Barong (mythology), name of the king of the spirits, leader of the hosts of good, and enemy of Rangda in the mythological traditions of Bali
 Barong Temple, a 9th-century Hindu temple located near Prambanan, Yogyakarta
 Barong (sword), a short, yet wide, leaf shaped blade sword or knife used by the Moro peoples of the Philippines and Sabah

See also
 Barongan, a traditional Indonesian Reog dance, also performed by Indonesians in Malaysia
 Barongsai, a traditional lion dance of Chinese descendants in Indonesia